Star Wreck may refer to:
 Star Wreck, a series of Finnish Star Trek parody movies by Samuli Torssonen
 Star Wreck (book series), a series of Star Trek parody novels by Leah Rewolinski
 Star Wreck (video game), a computer game that takes place in a parody of the Star Trek universe
 Star Wreck: In the Pirkinning, 2005 film
 Star Wreck Roleplaying Game, a Finnish role-playing game based on the films
 Star Wreck, a short film parodying Star Trek that won an award on America's Funniest Home Videos in its 1989 first season, which depicted the entire crew played by the same man.